The Spanish Armada was the fleet that attempted to escort an army from Flanders as a part the Habsburg Spanish invasion of England in 1588, was divided into ten "squadrons" (escuadras) The twenty galleons in the Squadrons of Portugal and of Castile, together with one more galleon in the Squadron of Andalucia and the four galleasses from Naples, constituted the only purpose-built warships (apart from the four galleys, which proved ineffective in the Atlantic waters and soon departed for safety in French ports); the rest of the Armada comprised armed merchantmen (mostly naos/carracks) and various ancillary vessels including urcas (storeships, termed "hulks"), zabras and pataches, pinnaces, and (not included in the formal count) caravels. The division into squadrons was for administrative purposes only; upon sailing, the Armada could not keep to a formal order, and most ships sailed independently from the rest of their squadron. Each squadron was led by a flagship (capitana) and a "vice-flagship" (almiranta).  This list is compiled by a survey drawn up by Medina Sidonia on the Armada's departure from Lisbon on 9 May 1588 and sent to Felipe II; it was then published and quickly became available to the English. The numbers of sailors and soldiers mentioned below are as given in the same survey and thus also relate to this date.

List of Squadron Commanders
 Alonso Pérez de Guzmán, 7th Duke of Medina Sidonia, commander of the Squadron of Portugal and of the whole enterprise
 Diego Flores de Valdés, commander of the Squadron of Castile
 Hugo de Moncada i Gralla, commander of the Squadron of Galleasses of Naples
 Juan Martínez de Recalde, commander of the Squadron of Biscay
 Pedro de Valdés, commander of the Squadron of Andalusia
 Miguel de Oquendo, commander of the Squadron of Guipuzcoa
 Martín de Bertendona, commander of the Squadron of Levantines
 Juan Gómez de Medina, commander of the Squadron of Hulks or Urcas
 Antonio Hurtado de Mendoza, commander of the Squadron of Communication (he died during the voyage to England, and was succeeded by Agustín de Ojeda)
 Diego de Medrano, commander of the Squadron of Galleys of Portugal

These commanders did not necessarily sail in the capitana (flagship) of the squadron of which they were technically in command. In view of this, in the event of the loss of the fleet flagship with its commanders aboard, it was determined by Felipe II that command of the enterprise would then devolve upon Alonso Martínez de Leiva, who commanded the Rata Santa María Encoronada of the Squadron of Levantines.

Ships of the Squadrons

Squadron of Portugal
Twelve ships comprising ten galleons and two zabras (total seamen 1,293; total soldiers 3,330);
 São Martinho (48 guns). Known in Spanish as San Martin and in English as Saint Martin. Flagship of the commander-in-chief (Fleet Capitana), the Duke of Medina Sidonia and Maestre Francisco Arias de Bobadilla, the senior army officer. She carried the aforementioned 48 heavy guns on two enclosed gun decks, plus multiple smaller weapons).
 São João (de Portugal). (50 guns). Vice-flagship (Fleet Almiranta). Known in Spanish as San Juan de Portugal and in English as Saint John of Portugal. Captained by Recalde (captain of this ship later in the expedition).
 São Marcos (33 guns).
 São Filipe (40 guns).
 São Luis (38 guns).
 São Mateus (34 guns). Known in Spanish as San Mateo and in English as Saint Matthew.
 Santiago (24 guns).
 Florencia (52 guns). The Tuscan-built galleon San Francisco (São Francisco in Portuguese) was appropriated, renamed and integrated within the squadron of Portuguese galleons. Older Portuguese galleons like the São Lucas and the São Rafael had already been withdrawn from service; one was still in the squadron at Lisbon, but was too small and too rotted to accompany the Squadron), and she was substituted by the Florencia.

Squadron of Castile
Sixteen ships comprising ten galleons, four armed merchant carracks (naos) and two pataches (total seamen 1,719; total soldiers 2,458); seven of the galleons were built as a class at Guarnizo in 1583–83.
 San Cristobal (36 guns). Flagship of Diego Flores de Valdés (who served as chief-of-staff to Medina Sidonia aboard the São Martinho throughout the campaign, and did not set foot aboard the San Cristobal during the campaign).
 San Juan Bautista (24 guns). Vice-flagship.
 San Pedro (24 guns).
 San Juan (24 guns).
 Santiago el Mayor (24 guns).
 San Felipe y Santiago (24 guns).
 Asunción (24 guns).
 Nuestra Señora del Barrio (24 guns).
 San Medel y Celedon (24 guns).
 Santa Ana (24 guns).
 Nuestra Señora de Begoña (nao).
 La Trinidad Bogitar (nao).
 La Santa Catalina (nao).
 San Juan Bautista (nao).
 Patache Nuestra Señora del Socorro (or Nuestra Señora del Rosario). (14 guns).
 Patache San Antonio de Padua (12 guns).

Squadron of Galleasses of Naples
Four ships (galleasses); the flagship (capitana) of Don Hugo de Moncada was the San Lorenzo; when she was captured by the French at Calais after a hard fight with the English, Moncada died from a bullet wound.

These powerfully-armed vessels were built for the Neapolitan Navy (probably in Sicily) a decade earlier. Each had 28 oars on each side, but relied on a square-rigged sailing arrangement installed for the 1588 campaign, as they were slow under oars alone. Their armament consisted on six forward-firing heavy cannon in the bows and four similar guns rear-firing in the stern; they also had 20 smaller guns (4- to 12-pounders) mounted in the fore and stern castles, and 20 swivel-mounted light guns on the raised catwalks above the rowers' benches.
 San Lorenzo (50 guns). Grounded at Calais after the Battle of Gravelines. Captured by the French after a hard fight with the English that cost Don Hugo de Moncada his life.
 Zúñiga (50 guns). Forced to take refuge at Le Havre after suffering rudder damage while trying to return home. It is unclear whether Zúñiga ever returned home. It was last reported silted up at Le Havre after an unsuccessful effort to sail home.
 Girona (50 guns). Wrecked 30 October 1588 at Lacada Point, County Antrim, Ireland. There may have been as many as 1,295 casualties due to the Girona carrying survivors from Santa Maria Rata Encoronada and Duquesa Santa Ana.
 Napolitana (50 guns).

Squadron of Viscaya (Biscay)
Fourteen ships comprising ten naos and four pataches (total seamen 863; total soldiers 1,937);
 Santa Ana (30 guns: Flagship of Juan Martinez de Recalde, Captain General and second in command of the Armada). Commanded by Nicolas de Isla.
 El Gran Grin (28 guns: Vice-flagship). Commanded by Pedro de Mendoza.
 Santiago (25 guns).
 La Concepción de Zubelzu. (16 guns).
 La Concepción de Juan del Cano (18 guns).
 La Magdalena (18 guns).
 San Juan (21 guns).
 La María Juan (24 guns).
 La Manuela (24 guns).
 Santa María de Montemayor (18 guns).
 Patache La María de Aguirre (6 guns).
 Patache La Isabela (10 guns).
 Patache de Miguel de Suso (6 guns).
 Patache San Esteban (6 guns).

Squadron of Andalusia
Eleven ships comprising nine naos, one galleon and one patache (total seamen 780; total soldiers 2,325);
 Nuestra Señora del Rosario (46 guns). Flagship of Don Pedro de Valdés.
 San Francisco (21 guns). Vice-flagship.
 San Juan Bautista (31 guns).
 San Juan de Gargarín (16 guns).
 La Concepción (20 guns).
 Duquesa Santa Ana (23 guns).
 Santa Catalina (23 guns).
 La Trinidad (13 guns).
 Santa María del Juncal (20 guns).
 San Bartolomé (20 guns).
 Patache El Espíritu Santo (32 guns).

Squadron of Guipúzcoa
Fourteen ships comprising ten naos and four pataches (total seamen 616; total soldiers 1,992);
 Santa Ana (47 guns). Flagship of Miguel de Oquendo.
 Santa Maria de la Rosa (or Nuestra Señora de la Rosa). (47 guns). Vice-flagship.
 San Salvador (25 guns).
 San Esteban (26 guns).
 Santa María (or Santa Marta). (20 guns).
 Santa Barbara (12 guns).
 San Buenaventura (21 guns).
 La María San Juan (12 guns).
 Santa Cruz (18 guns).
 Doncella (16 guns).
 Patache La Asunción (9 guns).
 Patache San Bernabé (9 guns).
 Pinaza Nuestra Señora de Guadalupe (1 gun).
 Pinaza Magdalena (1 gun).

Squadron of Levantines
Ten Mediterranean merchant carracks (naos) embargoed in Sicily and in Lisbon (total seamen 767; total soldiers 2,780);
 La Regazona (30 guns). Venetian merchantman. Flagship of Martín de Bertendona.
 La Lavia (25 guns). Venetian merchantman. Vice-flagship.
 Santa María (La Rata Encoronada)  (35 guns). Genoese merchantman.
 San Juan de Sicilia (26 guns). Ragusan merchantman.
 La Trinidad Valencera (42 guns). Venetian merchantman.
 Presveta Anunciada (24 guns). Ragusan merchantman.
 San Nicolás Prodaneli (26 guns). Ragusan merchantman.
 Juliana (32 guns). Catalan merchantman.
 Santa María de Visón (de Biscione) (18 guns). Ragusan merchantman.
 La Trinidad de Escala (22 guns). Genoese merchantman.

Squadron of Urcas
Twenty three ships (total seamen 608; total soldiers 3,121);
 El Gran Grifón (38 guns). Flagship of Juan Gómez de Medina. Wrecked, 27 September 1588 at Stroms Hellier, Fair Isle, Shetland Islands, Scotland. Her three hundred sailors spent six weeks on the island.
 San Salvador (24 guns). Vice-flagship.
 Perro Marino (7 guns).
 Falcon Blanco Mayor (16 guns).
 Castillo Negro (27 guns). The ship foundered off Donegal, Ireland.
 Barca de Amburgo (or Barca de Hamburg) (23 guns). The ship sank during a storm south-west of Fair Isle, Scotland. Her crew were taken aboard El Gran Grifon and La Trinidad Valencera; both were later wrecked.
 Casa de Paz Grande (26 guns).
 San Pedro Mayor (29 guns) a crew of 28 mariners and also 113 Soldiers on board, was run aground in Hope Cove, Devon, on 7 November 1588 one of two hospital ships, the ship was a hulk (cargo). The crew walked to safety from the ship, Sir William Courtney looked after the 140 men
 El Sansón (18 guns).
 San Pedro Menor (18 guns).
 Barca de Anzique (or Barca de Danzig) (26 guns).
 Falcon Blanco Mediano (16 guns). Lost on Connemara coast, County Galway, possibly near Inish Boffin, on Freaghillaun Rock?, Ireland.
 San Andrés (14 guns).
 Casa de Paz Chica (15 guns).
 Ciervo Volante (18 guns). She was wrecked off the west Irish coast.
 Paloma Blanca (12 guns).
 La Ventura (4 guns).
 Santa Bárbara (10 guns).
 Santiago (19 guns). Wrecked near Mosterhamn in Hardanger Fjord, south of Bergen, Norway.
 David (7 guns).
 El Gato (9 guns).
 Esayas (4 guns).
 San Gabriel (4 guns). Possibly wrecked near Kinlochbervie in the Scottish Highlands

AS noted in the above lists 9 Spanish Armada vessels fates are listed as "Unknown". 9 unidentified Armada vessels were reported lost off Ireland:
County Donegal:
Six further ships — unidentified — were wrecked on the Donegal coast:
 Two destroyed vessels at Killybegs (Crews later lost in Girona shipwreck)
 one at Mullaghderg:In 1797 a quantity of lead and some brass guns were raised from the wreck of an unknown Armada ship at Mullaghderg in County Donegal.
 Two vessels:One at Rinn a' Chaislean.Two miles further south, in 1853, an anchor was recovered from another unknown Armada wreck.
 The sixth was found in 2010 at Burtonport.
County Mayo:
Three vessels lost County Mayo:
 In September 1588 a galleon was wrecked at Tyrawley (modern County Mayo). Tradition has it that another ship was wrecked in the vicinity, near Kid Island, but no record remains of this event. Survivors are reported to have come from a wreck in Broadhaven of another ship, which had entered that bay without masts.

Squadron of Communication
Twenty two Pataches and Zabras (5 to 10 guns) under Don Antonio Hurtado de Mendoza (total seamen 574; total soldiers 479);
 Nuestra Señora del Pilar de Zaragoza
 La Caridad Inglesa
 San Andrés Escosés (sic) (San Andrés Escocés) 
 El Santo Crucifijo
 Nuestra Señora del Puerto
 La Concepción de Carasa
 Nuestra Señora Begoña
 La Concepción Capetillo
 San Jeronimo
 Nuestra Señora de Gracia
 La Concepción Francisco de Latero
 Nuestra Señora de Guadalupe
 San Francisco
 Espiritu Santo
 Trinidad (zabra)
 Nuestra Señora de Castro (zabra)
 Santo Andres
 La Concepción de Valmeseda
 La Concepción de Somanila
 San Juan de Carasa
 Asunción

Squadron of Galleys of Portugal
Four ships under Diego de Medrano (total seamen 362; total rowers 888; no soldiers);
 Capitania (5 guns). Foundered off Bayonne, France, in the Bay of Biscay.
 Princesa (5 guns).
 Diana (5 guns).
 Bazana (5 guns).

Miscellaneous Caravels ("Round" caravels and Lateen caravels)
 São Lourenço
 Santo António (1ª)
 Nossa Senhora da Conceição (1ª)
 Jesus da Ajuda
 São João
 Santo António (2ª)
 A Conceição (2ª)
 São Jorge
 Nossa Senhora da Assunção
 Conceição (3ª)
 Santo António (3ª)
 Nossa Senhora da Assunção (Nossa Senhora da Conceição (2ª), possibly did not join the expedition beyond Corunna. Only eleven left Lisbon, and possibly about 9 or 10 (?), after the storm, left Corunna).

Complement of the Fleet
 141 ships.
 8,766 sailors.
 21,556 soldiers.
 2,088 convict rowers

Ship Types
Source

Galleon
 Pronunciation:  . Etymology: Old Spanish galeón, from Middle French galion, from Old French galie. Date: 1529.
Galleon: A heavy square-rigged sailing ship of the 16th to early 18th centuries used for war or commerce especially by the Spanish. They were the fastest ships built during the 16th century. Galleons were large, multi-decked sailing ships first used as armed cargo carriers. The full body of the fleet took two days to leave port. A typical Spanish galleon was 100–150 feet in length and 40–50 feet wide.

Galley
 Pronunciation:  . Etymology: Middle English galeie, from Anglo-French galie, galee, ultimately from Middle Greek galea. Date: 13th century.
Galley: A ship or boat propelled solely or chiefly by oars:
 a long low ship used for war and trading especially in the Mediterranean Sea from the Middle Ages to the 19th century;
 also : galleass : a warship of classical antiquity — compare bireme, trireme;
 a large open boat (as a gig) formerly used in England.

Galleass
 Pronunciation:  . Etymology: Middle French galeasse, from Old French galie galley. Date: 1544.
Galleass: A large fast galley used especially as a warship by Mediterranean countries in the 16th and 17th centuries and having both sails and oars but usually propelled chiefly by rowing.

Urca
 "The urcas, supply hulks, had largely been requisitioned when they sailed into Spanish ports, regardless of their owners' rights and wishes. Baltic made urcas with two lateen mizzen masts were unable to sail close to the wind. They were also no good for fitting fighting 'castles' to. Some urcas came from Hanseatic ports. In all there were twenty three urcas in the fleet."

Zabra
 Zabras were small or midsized two-masted sailing ships used off the coasts of Spain and Portugal to carry goods by sea from the 13th century until the mid-16th century; they were well-armed to defend themselves against pirates and privateers.

Patache
 A patache is a type of sailing vessel with two masts, very light and shallow, a sort of cross between a brig and a schooner, which originally was a warship, being intended for surveillance and inspection of the coasts and ports.

Pinaza
 The pinaza (pinnace) is a light boat, propelled by oars or sails, carried aboard merchant and war vessels to serve as a tender.

Caravel
 Latin-rigged Caravel (Lateen Caravel), a highly manoeuvrable sailing ship. The lateen sails gave her speed and the capacity for sailing to windward (beating). Caravels were used especially by the Portuguese for the oceanic exploration voyages during the 15th and 16th centuries.

Square-rigged caravel (Round caravel)
 the Square-rigged caravel is another type of caravel which is a combination of the carrack and the caravel, distinguished from both ships by its combined sails, with four or more masts, usually three with lateen rigged sails and the fore-mast with two square sails, and by its hull design which is narrower and longer (with a sterncastle, forecastle and a galleon design). It is doubtful that the caravels of Portugal in the Spanish Armada - with the assistance mission, support, and transport of provisions and military items - had the size and the heavy weaponry of the other traditional Portuguese large Caravelas de Armada (Square-rigged caravels).

Nao (Carrack)
 A three- or four-masted ocean-going sailing ships that are developed from the 14th Century to the 17th Century.

Summary of Armada Make Up
 Total Number of Ships Mustered at A Coruña = 137
 Total tons of Shipping at Muster = 58,705
 Total people on ships, soldiers & sailors = 25,826 people
 Total number of Guns = 2,477
 Total Number of Ships Lost/Burned/Missing =  to 44
 Total Number that Failed to Start to leave Coruña = 5
By 5LK

Collecting Data/ Under Construction

See also
 List of shipwrecks in the 16th century
 Spanish Armada in Ireland
 Hugo of Moncada i Gralla

References

Bibliography
 The Spanish Armada, Colin Martin and Geoffrey Parker, 1988. Guild Publishing, . 2nd (revised) edition 1999.
 
 The Spanish Armada, Roger Whiting, 1988. Sutton Publishing, .
 The Spanish Armada, John Tincey, 1988. Osprey Publishing, .
 Armada, Patrick Williams, 2000. Tempus Publishing, .
 Ireland: Graveyard of the Spanish Armada, T. P. Kilfeather. 1967, Anvil Books.
 The Confident Hope of a Miracle, Neil Hanson, 2003. .
 The Defeat of the Spanish Armada, Garrett Mattingley, 1959. Jonathan Cape.
 Armada in Ireland, Niall Fallon, 1978. Stamford Maritime.
 Elizabeth's Sea Dogs, Hugh Bicheno, 2012, Conway imprint of Anova Books, .
 The Armada Campaign 1588, Angus Konstam, 2001. Osprey Publishing, . 2nd impression 2008.
 Armada 1588-1988, National Maritime Museum, 1988, Penguin Books, .

Spanish Armada